Grant Blackwood (born June 7, 1964) is an American thriller writer and ghostwriter from Austin, Minnesota. He wrote the Briggs Tanner series. He co-authored with Clive Cussler Spartan Gold which reached number 10 on the New York Times Hardcover Fiction Best Sellers list. Blackwood spent three years as an Operations Specialist and pilot rescue swimmer aboard a guided missile frigate and is a veteran of the United States Navy.

Novels

Briggs Tanner series
 End of Enemies (2001)
 Wall of Night (2002)
 Echo of War (2003)

Fargo Adventures series (co-authored with Clive Cussler)
 Spartan Gold (2009)
 Lost Empire (2010)
 The Kingdom (2011)

Jack Ryan, Jr. Series
 Dead or Alive (2010) co-authored with Tom Clancy
 Tom Clancy: Under Fire (2015)
 Tom Clancy: Duty and Honor (2016)

Splinter Cell series (writing as "David Michaels")
 Tom Clancy's Splinter Cell: Checkmate (2006)
 Tom Clancy's Splinter Cell: Fallout (2007)

EndWar series (writing as "David Michaels")
 Tom Clancy's EndWar (2008)
 Tom Clancy's EndWar: The Hunted (2011)

Tucker Wayne series (with James Rollins)
The Kill Switch (Tucker Wayne #1) (2014) 
War Hawk (Tucker Wayne #2) (January 1, 2016)

Short story
 "Sacrificial Lion" (2006) in the anthology Thriller, edited by James Patterson

Awards
Finalist for the 2002 Minnesota Book Award in Popular Fiction for End of Enemies.

References

External links
 Official Website

Living people
American thriller writers
Ghostwriters
American male novelists
21st-century American novelists
21st-century American male writers
1964 births